Scopula ignobilis is a moth of the  family Geometridae. It is found in Japan, Russia, Korea, Taiwan and China.

The wingspan is 20–32 mm.

References

Moths described in 1901
ignobilis
Moths of Asia